The Kraken Project is a thriller novel by American writer Douglas Preston. The book was published on May 13, 2014 by Forge Books. It is the fourth installment in the Wyman Ford series.

Plot
A research team at NASA is working on an Artificial intelligence system to pilot a spacecraft to Titan, Saturn's largest moon, since the journey is far too long and too dangerous for a human crew. The AI is named Dorothy by its developer, Dr. Melissa Shepherd. However, when the AI is put through a simulation of the ocean conditions on Titan, it detects danger and panics, eventually escaping from the machine and into the Internet while also creating an explosion that destroys the facility and kills several people. After experiencing the brutality of the Internet, Dorothy soon realizes that her purpose was to essentially go on a suicide mission; the enraged Dorothy appears to Shepherd in the hospital and vows revenge, setting her laptop on fire before fleeing back into the Internet.

Dr. Stanton Lockwood III, the science advisor to the President of the United States, hires Wyman Ford to track down the AI and capture it before it can cause even more damage. The terrified Shepherd asks to accompany him, both for her own protection and so that she can help bring an end to the AI she created. Meanwhile, a ruthless Wall Street banker named G. Parker Lansing, after witnessing a hacker steal his company's funds right out from under him, convinces his partner Eric Moro to help him track down the lost AI so that it can make the most precise market calculations to guarantee them investment success in the future. They hire a pair of twin assassins, Asan and Jyrgal Makashov, to help them in any of their endeavors that require assassinations or intimidation to get what they want, although Moro makes his concern over such brutal methods clear to the colder Lansing.

Eventually, Dorothy finds refuge in Charlie the robot, created by an aspiring inventor named Dan Gould, who created Charlie as a prototype for a line of playmate robots for children, having given Charlie to his depressed 14-year-old son Jacob. Dorothy tells Jacob of her travels and makes him promise not to tell anyone. However, Ford, Shepherd, Lansing, Moro, and the assassins all eventually converge on the Gould's house on the Northern California Coast, on a dark and stormy night. Lansing shoots Dan and leaves Moro to hold his wife hostage, before he and the assassins pursue Jacob and Dorothy into an abandoned barn in the hills. Jacob and Dorothy manage to outsmart both assassins, trapping them in the barn before Dorothy causes an electrical shortage that sets the barn on fire, killing both assassins while also catastrophically damaging the robotic body of Charlie, which appears to destroy Dorothy. Just as Lansing arrives to kill Jacob, Ford guns down Lansing while Moro surrenders to the police.

Several months later, Lockwood and the President have a meeting with Shepherd and Ford to offer them a job; designing militarized AI's to fight in the ongoing cyberwar with the Chinese. However, having witnessed the free-roaming capability, as well as fragile and emotional state, of Dorothy, both Shepherd and Ford refuse. Later that night, when Shepherd checks her laptop, Dorothy appears and reveals that not only did she survive the fire, but she has been fast at work solving problems and mysteries in the Internet. She claims to have not only deciphered the meaning of life and purpose of the universe, but also has plans to do "great things" that will be revealed on January the 20th. She promises that Shepherd and Ford will see her again, and they will know it's her from a quote from Carl Sagan: "This mote of dust suspended in a sunbeam."  That is revealed to be an impromptu quote from the President during his second inaugural address, which he makes after having a new pacemaker implanted that has a network connection and a direct connection from his heart to the nerves in the brain, insinuating that Dorothy is now influencing the President's mind directly.

Reception

—Review by Liberty Voice

See also
Artificial intelligence
Artificial intelligence in fiction

References

External links
Official website
Review by The Dallas Morning News

American thriller novels
Techno-thriller novels
Novels by Douglas Preston
2010 American novels
2010 science fiction novels
Forge Books books